Gabriel Salazar Vergara (born 31 January 1936) is a Chilean historian. He is known in his country for his study of social history and interpretations of social movements, particularly the recent student protests of 2006 and 2011–12.

Salazar was born into a lower class family, he studied history, sociology and philosophy at Universidad de Chile, and for time he was assistant of historian Mario Góngora and classical historian Héctor Herrera Cajas. Salazar used to be a member of the Revolutionary Left Movement until 1973. In that year he was tortured in Villa Grimaldi by the military. Having been released from a military prison camp in 1976 he went into exile in the United Kingdom. There he obtained a scholarship for continued studies in University of Hull. He obtained a PhD in Economic and Social History from that university in 1984. Next year he returned to Chile. Relatively unknown Salazar's breakthrough came in 1985.

His subject of study has included peons, labourers, proletarians, child huachos and women. Salazar is one of the founders of the historiographic current known as Nueva Historia Social. Salazar considers history as a useful tool for social action. In interview he has declared himself a "leftist, critical social historian" and rejected the label "Marxist".

Biography
Salazar was born into a lower class religious Catholic family. His family lived in the Santiago shanty-town (población) Manuel Montt.

From 1964 to 1968, he worked at the Pontifical Catholic University of Valparaíso History Institute alongside Héctor Herrera Cajas. There, he taught the signature theory of history.

Particular views
Salazar describes the 2011-2012 Chilean student conflict as being the continuation of a long strife between popular citizen movements and civic and military dictatorships. In October 2011, Salazar led a campaign aiming to hold a citizen's plebiscite on the demands behind the 2011-2012 Chilean student protests.

Salazar has been critical of various historical figures like José Miguel Carrera and Diego Portales. In addition Salazar has sparkled controversy by his criticism of contemporary student leader Camila Vallejo.

Bibliography
Labradores, Peones y Proletarios (1985)
Violencia Política Popular en las Grandes Alamedas (1990)
Los Intelectuales, los Pobres y el Poder (1995)
Autonomía, Espacio y Gestión (1998)
Manifiesto de Historiadores (compilador) (1999)
Historia Contemporánea de Chile (Junto con Julio Pinto - five volumes) (1999-2002)
Ferias libres: espacio residual de soberanía popular (2002)
Historia de la acumulación capitalista en Chile (2003)
La Construcción del Estado en Chile (1800–1830) (2006)
Ser niño "huacho" en la historia de Chile (2007) 
Mercaderes, empresarios y capitalistas (2009)
Conversaciones con Carlos Altamirano (2010)
En el nombre del poder popular constituyente (Chile siglo XXI) (2011)
La enervante levedad histórica de la clase política civil (Chile, 1900-1973) (2015)
La historia desde abajo y desde adentro (2017)
El ejército de Chile y la soberanía popular (2019)

Notes

References

External links

Chilean historians
20th-century Chilean historians
20th-century Chilean male writers
21st-century Chilean historians
21st-century Chilean male writers
Chilean sociologists
1936 births
Living people
Chilean former marxists
Chilean schoolteachers
Academic staff of the Pontifical Catholic University of Chile
University of Chile alumni
Academic staff of the Pontifical Catholic University of Valparaíso
Academic staff of the University of Chile
Revolutionary Left Movement (Chile) politicians
Chilean exiles
People from Santiago
Alumni of the University of Hull
Social historians